Events in the year 1967 in Bulgaria.

Incumbents 

 General Secretaries of the Bulgarian Communist Party: Todor Zhivkov
 Chairmen of the Council of Ministers: Todor Zhivkov

Events

Sports

Births 

 Ivan Tasev, Bulgarian volleyball player.
 Magarditch Halvadjian, Bulgarian director and producer.

Deaths

References 

 
1960s in Bulgaria
Years of the 20th century in Bulgaria
Bulgaria
Bulgaria